The Star Awards for Special Achievement Award is an award presented annually at the Star Awards, a ceremony that was established in 1994.

The category was introduced in 1995, at the 2nd Star Awards ceremony; Xiang Yun received the award for her performance and it is given in honour of a MediaCorp artiste who have made significant contributions in the performance of his/her respective field of profession over the past few years. Winners are selected by a majority vote from the entire judging panel.

The award was initially discontinued from 2004, but was revived in 2018.

Since its inception, the award has been given to eleven artistes. Chew Chor Meng is the most recent winner in this category.

Recipients

References

External links 

Star Awards